Tiandi No.1 Beverage Inc. is a Chinese non-alcoholic beverage company. The company produces apple vinegar.

Corporate history

The founder of the company, Chen Sheng, invented his old vinegar recipe in 1997 and starts selling to the customers. In 2002, the company was incorporated. In 2007, the company starts selling Tiandi No.1 apple vinegar.

The shares of the company is traded in the Chinese over-the-counter National Equities Exchange and Quotations since 2015. Although Chen Sheng and his brother Wang Guang, owned a combined 85.17% shares of the company as at 31 December 2015. Moreover, the top 10 shareholders owned a combined 97.08% shares, including directors Zhang Luan (ranked 3rd for 4.98%) and Yan Bin (ranked 6th for 1.00%).

In April 2019, the company announced to form a joint venture with fellow beverage company Huiyuan Juice. However, in July the deal was terminated.

Notable equity investment
Tiandi No.1 Beverage owned 18.06% shares of Haisheng Juice as of 2015. Since 2016, Haisheng Juice is a supplier of Tiandi No.1 Beverage.

Controversy
In 2013, Guangdong "Time Weekly" reported that the company stored their ingredients improperly, as well as addictive was added to produce their vinegar, concerning the actual quality of their drinks.

In 2019, The Beijing News criticised the accuracy of the financial reports of the company.

Sister company
Sister company Guangdong Tiandi Food Group, was the parent company of a football club based in Zhanjiang. The sister company named the club "Zhanjiang Tiandi No.1 F.C.". Chen also owned Guangdong No.1 Food Co., Ltd., which sold "No.1 Native Pig" and "No.1 Native Chicken". Chen was ranked joint-357th in 2012 Forbes China Rich List.

References

External links
 

Drink companies of China
Companies listed on the National Equities Exchange and Quotations
Civilian-run enterprises of China